Nahub is a village situated in Nalanda district in the Indian state of Bihar. The village is located midway between the cities of Silao and Rajgir.

References

Villages in Nalanda district